The Sichuan anti-Mongol fortresses are 83 mountain cities built by the soldiers and civilians of the Southern Song Dynasty during the Mongol conquest of China in Sichuan to resist the invasion of the Mongol Empire. Taking full advantage of the geographical advantages of the Sichuan Basin, these fortresses formed a comprehensive three-dimensional defense system, which succeeded in resisting the Mongol attacks for up to 53 years, greatly extending the life of Southern Song. They also made Sichuan the last to be conquered by the Mongolians in 1288. Due to the defense of the fortresses, it was difficult to settle the Sichuan region. The Mongol Army had to abort its original strategy of "taking Shu (Sichuan) and destroying Song" and moved to the area of Jingzhou and Xiangyang starting from 1271, defeating the Song Dynasty via the Han River. Möngke Khan became the only Mongol khagan to perish on the battlefield when he died during an assault on Diaoyucheng in 1259. He may have been a victim of  dysentery or of injuries sustained when attacking the fortress.

At present, there are still 48 fortresses kept to this date from the Song Dynasty in Sichuan and Chongqing. Among them, five of them (including Diaoyucheng and Baidicheng) were recognized as Major Historical and Cultural Sites Protected at the National Level. Another 14 of the fortresses were selected as major historical and cultural sites protected by Sichuan Province and Chongqing. But overall, except for a select few such as Diaoyucheng, most of them have not been effectively protected or developed.

History 
The Sino-Mongol wars in Sichuan began in 1227, known as the 1227 incident or the Dinghai incident. The Mongolian army attacked Western Xia while sending troops into Sichuan, and captured five prefectures belonging to Lizhou Circuit near Sichuan. In 1236, Kashin, the second son of Ögedei Khan, led the Mongolian army to the south of Sichuan, breaking through the Song defense line at Kaizhou, Lizhou Circuit, and entered the Sichuan Basin. Three circuits in Sichuan were almost completely occupied except Kuizhou Circuit, and the Song only kept a few states such as Luzhou, Guo prefecture, and Hezhou. After this, the Mongolian army continued to invade Sichuan. In 1241, it took Chengdu again, nearing Kuizhou, and the Sichuan defense line was nearly destroyed. In 1241, Yu Jie moved the military and political center of Sichuan from Chengdu to Chongqing, which was easier to defend. After understanding that defending on flat land failed to stop the Mongol army, Yu began to build a mountain defense system and relocated the state government offices in the Sichuan province into the Daba Mountains. Most of the fortresses were located near cliffs of the mountains. The top of the mountains were wide and flat, there was enough arable land and water, so they were self-sufficient and could be defended for a long time. At the same time, the mountain cities were often connected by rivers and roads at the junction of valleys or rivers. The defense of the Southern Song Dynasty used Chongqing, Jiading and Kuimen as the centers of the defense of Sichuan, which resisted the invasion of Mongolia for 53 years. Even after the Battle of Yamen in 1279, which ended the Southern Song dynasty, two of the fortresses (Santaicheng and Lingxiaocheng) had not fallen. The former lasted for an extra year until 1280, and the latter lasted until 1288, making it the last place under Song control.

List

References 

Song dynasty architecture